The 2014–15 División de Honor was the 76th season of the División de Honor, Spain's premier field hockey league for women. It began on 27 September 2014 and concluded on 3 May 2015.

Club de Campo were the defending champions.

Competition

Format
The División de Honor regular season takes place between September and April through 18 matchdays in a round-robin format. Upon completion of regular season, the top four teams are qualified to play the Final Four, while bottom two teams are relegated to División de Honor B. Points are awarded according to the following:
2 points for a win
1 points for a draw

Teams

Regular season standings

Play–offs

Semi-finals

Final

Top goalscorers

References

See also
División de Honor de Hockey Hierba 2014–15

External links
Official site

División de Honor Femenina de Hockey Hierba
2014–15 in European field hockey
field hockey
field hockey
2014 in women's field hockey
2015 in women's field hockey